This article lists unincorporated communities of the province of Newfoundland and Labrador, Canada.

Incorporated towns and cities are incorporated municipalities and can be found on List of municipalities in Newfoundland and Labrador.

Newfoundland and Labrador at Confederation in 1949 had nearly 1,450 communities. Today it has fewer than 700. A listing of abandoned communities is found at the List of ghost towns in Newfoundland and Labrador.



A

 Aaron Arm, Burgeo (Newfoundland)
 Allan's Island, Lamaline (Newfoundland)
 Amherst Cove (Newfoundland)
 Angels Cove (Newfoundland)
 Angelbrook, Glovertown (Newfoundland)
 Apsey Beach (Newfoundland)
 Apsey Brook (Newfoundland)
 Argentia, Placentia (Newfoundland)
 Arnold's Cove Station (Newfoundland)
 Aspen Cove (Newfoundland)

B

Back Cove, Fogo (Newfoundland)
Back Harbour, Twillingate (Newfoundland)
Bacon Cove, Conception Harbour (Newfoundland)
Badger's Quay, New-Wes-Valley (Newfoundland)
Bailey's Cove, Bonavista (Newfoundland)
Bailey's Point, Glenburnie-Birchy Head-Shoal Brook (Newfoundland)
Ballyhack, Avondale (Newfoundland)
Bank Head (Newfoundland)
Bannatyne Cove, Corner Brook (Newfoundland)
Barachois Brook (Newfoundland)
Barr'd Islands, Fogo (Newfoundland)
Bareneed (Newfoundland)
Barr'd Harbour (Newfoundland)
Bartletts Harbour (Newfoundland)
Barton (Newfoundland)
Bauline East (Newfoundland)
Bayview, Twillingate (Newfoundland)
Beaches (Newfoundland)
Beachy Cove, Bay Roberts (Newfoundland)
Beau Bois (Newfoundland)
Beaumont, Lushes Bight-Beaumont-Beaumont North (Newfoundland)
Bellevue (Newfoundland)
Benoits Cove (Newfoundland)
Benoits Siding (Newfoundland)
Benton (Newfoundland)
Birchy Cove (Newfoundland)
Biscay Bay (Newfoundland)
Black Duck (Newfoundland)
Black Duck Brook (Newfoundland)
Black Duck Cove, Great Northern Peninsula (Newfoundland)
Black Duck Cove, Notre Dame Bay (Newfoundland)
Black Duck Pond (Newfoundland)
Black River (Newfoundland)
Black Tickle (Labrador)
Blaketown (Newfoundland)
Bloomfield (Newfoundland)
Blow Me Down, Conception Bay (Newfoundland)
Blue Cove (Newfoundland)
 Bickfordville
Boat Harbour (Newfoundland)
Bobby's Cove (Newfoundland)
Boswarlos (Newfoundland)
Bottle Cove (Newfoundland)
Boxey, St. Jacques-Coomb's Cove (Newfoundland)
Boyd's Cove (Newfoundland)
Bradley's Cove (Newfoundland)
Bridgeport (Newfoundland)
Brig Bay (Newfoundland)
Brigus Junction (Newfoundland)
Brigus South (Newfoundland)
Bristol's Hope (Newfoundland)
Britannia (Newfoundland)
Broad Cove, Trinity Bay (Newfoundland)
The Broads, South River (Newfoundland)
Brookfield (Newfoundland)
Brooklyn (Newfoundland)
Brookside (Newfoundland)
Brown's Arm (Newfoundland)
Buchans Junction (Newfoundland)
Buckle's Point, Forteau (Newfoundland)
Bunyan's Cove (Newfoundland)
Burgoyne's Cove (Newfoundland)
Burnt Cove (Newfoundland)
Burnt Point (Newfoundland)
Butlerville, Bay Roberts (Newfoundland)
Butter Cove (Newfoundland)

C

Calvert (Newfoundland)
Canning's Cove (Newfoundland)
Cape Freels (Newfoundland)
Cape Norman (Newfoundland
Cape Ray (Newfoundland)
Caplin Cove, Conception Bay (Newfoundland)
Cappahayden, Renews-Cappahayden (Newfoundland)
Capstan Island (Labrador)
Carter's Cove (Newfoundland)
Cartyville (Newfoundland)
Castor River North (Newfoundland)
Catalina, Trinity Bay North (Newfoundland)
Cavendish (Newfoundland)
Chamberlains, Conception Bay South (Newfoundland)
Champneys (Newfoundland)
Chanceport (Newfoundland)
Chapel's Cove, Harbour Main-Chapel's Cove-Lakeview (Newfoundland)
Charles Brook (Newfoundland)
Charleston (Newfoundland)
Charlottetown (Newfoundland)
Churchill Falls (Labrador)
Clarke's Head (Newfoundland)
Cobb's Arm (Newfoundland)
Codroy (Newfoundland)
Coffee Cove (Newfoundland)
Coley's Point, Bay Roberts (Newfoundland)
Comfort Cove, Comfort Cove-Newstead (Newfoundland)
Cottrell's Cove (Newfoundland)
Croque (Newfoundland)
Cull's Harbour (Newfoundland)
Cupids Crossing, Cupids (Newfoundland)
Curling, Corner Brook (Newfoundland)
Cuslett (Newfoundland)

D

Dawson's Cove (Newfoundland)
Deadman's Bay (Newfoundland)
Deadman's Cove (Newfoundland)
Deep Bay (Newfoundland)
Deep Bight (Newfoundland)
Dildo (Newfoundland)
The Dock (Newfoundland)
Domino (Labrador)
Donovans, Paradise (Newfoundland)
Doting Cove, Musgrave Harbour (Newfoundland)
The Droke, Burin (Newfoundland)
Dunfield (Newfoundland)
Dunville, Placentia (Newfoundland)
Durrell, Twillingate (Newfoundland)

E

Eddies Cove East (Newfoundland)
Eddies Cove West (Newfoundland)
Elliott's Cove (Newfoundland)
English Harbour (Newfoundland)
English Harbour West, St. Jacques-Coomb's Cove (Newfoundland)
Epworth (Newfoundland)

F

Fair Haven (Newfoundland)
Fairbank (Newfoundland)
Felix Cove (Newfoundland)
Flat Bay (Newfoundland)
Flat Bay West (Newfoundland)
Flat Islands (Newfoundland)
Flat Islands (Newfoundland)
Flatrock (Newfoundland)
Flatrock, Conception Bay (Newfoundland)
Flowers Cove (Newfoundland)
Fogo (Newfoundland)
Foote's Cove (Newfoundland)
Forrester's Point (Newfoundland)
Forteau (Labrador)
Fortune Bay (Newfoundland)
Fortune Harbour (Newfoundland)
Fox Harbour, Placentia Bay (Newfoundland)
Fox Island, Hermitage Bay (Newfoundland)
Fox Island, South Coast (Newfoundland)
Fox Island River (Newfoundland)
Fox Point (Labrador)
Fox Roost (Newfoundland)
Foxtrap (Newfoundland)
Francois (Newfoundland)
Frederickton (Newfoundland)
Frenchman's Cove (Newfoundland)
Freshwater, Bell Island (Newfoundland)
Freshwater, Conception Bay (Newfoundland)
Freshwater, Placentia Bay (Newfoundland)
Furby's Cove (Newfoundland)

G

Gander Bay South (Newfoundland)
Garden Cove (Newfoundland)
George's Brook (Newfoundland)
George's Cove (Labrador)
Georgetown (Newfoundland)
Gin Cove (Newfoundland)
Glovertown (Newfoundland)
Goobies (Newfoundland)
Goose Arm (Newfoundland)
Goose Cove, Hare Bay (Newfoundland)
Goose Cove, Placentia Bay (Newfoundland)
Goose Cove, Trinity Bay (Newfoundland)
Gooseberry Cove, Placentia Bay (Newfoundland)
Gooseberry Cove, Trinity Bay (Newfoundland)
Goulds (Newfoundland)
Goulds Road (Newfoundland)
Grand Bay West (Newfoundland)
Grand Beach (Newfoundland)
Grandois (Newfoundland)
Grand Falls (Newfoundland)
Grates Cove (Newfoundland)
Great Barasway (Newfoundland)
Great Brehat (Newfoundland)
Great Codroy (Newfoundland)
Great Harbour Deep (Newfoundland)
Green Cove (Newfoundland)
Green Island Cove (Newfoundland)
Green Point (Newfoundland)
Green's Harbour (Newfoundland)
Grey River (Newfoundland)
Gull Island (Newfoundland)

H

Halfway Point (Newfoundland)
Halls Town (Newfoundland)
Hamilton River (Newfoundland)
Happy Adventure (Newfoundland)
Harbour Buffett (Newfoundland)
Harbour Grace South (Newfoundland)
Harbour le Cou (Newfoundland)
Harbour Mille (Newfoundland)
Harbour Round (Newfoundland)
Harcourt (Newfoundland)
Harry's Harbour (Newfoundland)
Hatchet Cove (Newfoundland)
Heart's Content (Newfoundland)
Heart's Delight (Newfoundland)
Heart's Desire (Newfoundland)
Heatherton (Newfoundland)
Hebron (Labrador)
Henley Harbour (Labrador)
Hermitage-Sandyville (Newfoundland)
Herring Neck (Newfoundland)
Hibb's Cove (Newfoundland)
Hickman's Harbour (Newfoundland)
Highlands (Newfoundland)
Hillgrade (Newfoundland)
Hillview (Newfoundland)
Hiscock's Point (Newfoundland)
Hodge's Cove (Newfoundland)
Hoop Cove (Newfoundland)
Hopeall (Newfoundland)
Hopewell (Newfoundland)
Horse Islands (Newfoundland)
Horwood (Newfoundland)

I

Indian Arm (Newfoundland)
Indian Cove (Newfoundland)
Indian Pond (Newfoundland)
Indian Tickle (Labrador)
Island Cove (Newfoundland)
Island Harbour (Newfoundland)
Isle aux Morts (Newfoundland)
Islington (Newfoundland)
Ivanhoe (Newfoundland)
Ivany's Cove (Newfoundland)

J

Jackson's Arm (Newfoundland)
Jacques Fontaine (Newfoundland)
Jamestown (Newfoundland)
Jean de Baie (Newfoundland)
Jeffrey's (Newfoundland)
Jerry's Nose (Newfoundland)
Jersey Harbour (Newfoundland)
Jerseyside (Newfoundland)
Job's Cove (Newfoundland)
Journois (Newfoundland)

K

Kelligrews (Newfoundland)
Kerley's Harbour (Newfoundland)
Kettle Cove (Newfoundland)
The Keys (Newfoundland)
Kilbride (Newfoundland)
Kingston (Newfoundland)
Kingwell (Newfoundland)
Kitchuses (Newfoundland)
Knight's Cove (Newfoundland)

L

La Manche (Newfoundland)
La Manche Mines (Newfoundland)
La Poile (Newfoundland)
Ladle Cove (Newfoundland)
Lady Cove (Newfoundland)
Lake Siding (Newfoundland)
Lally Cove (Newfoundland)
Lancaster (Newfoundland)
Lance Cove (Newfoundland)
Langue de Cerf (Newfoundland)
L'Anse Amour (Labrador)
L'Anse aux Meadows (Newfoundland)
Laurenceton (Newfoundland)
Lead Cove (Newfoundland)
Lethbridge (Newfoundland)
Little Barasway (Newfoundland)
Little Bay (Newfoundland)
Little Catalina, Trinity Bay (Newfoundland)
Little Harbour (Newfoundland)
Little Harbour Deep (Newfoundland)
Little Harbour East (Newfoundland)
Little Heart's Ease (Newfoundland)
Little Paradise (Newfoundland)
Little Port (Newfoundland)
Little Rapids (Newfoundland)
Little Ridge (Newfoundland)
Little St. Lawrence (Newfoundland)
Lobster Cove (Newfoundland)
Lobster Harbour (Newfoundland)
Loch Leven (Newfoundland)
Loch Lomond (Newfoundland)
Lockport (Newfoundland)
Locks Cove (Newfoundland)
Lockston (Newfoundland)
Lomond (Newfoundland)
Long Beach (Newfoundland)
Loon Bay (Newfoundland)
Low Point (Newfoundland)
Lower Cove (Newfoundland)
Lower Island Cove (Newfoundland)
Lower Lance Cove (Newfoundland)

M

McCallum (Newfoundland)
McKay's (Newfoundland)
Maberly (Newfoundland)
Maddox Cove (Newfoundland)
Mahers (Newfoundland)
Main Point (Newfoundland)
Mainland (Newfoundland)
Makinsons (Newfoundland)
Makkovik (Labrador)
Mall Bay (Newfoundland)
Manuels (Newfoundland)
Manuel's Cove (Newfoundland)
Margaree (Newfoundland)
Markland (Newfoundland)
Marquise (Newfoundland)
Marysvale (Newfoundland)
Matthews Cove (Labrador)
Mattis Point (Newfoundland)
Melrose (Newfoundland)
Merasheen (Newfoundland)
Merritt's Harbour (Newfoundland)
Michael's Harbour (Newfoundland)
Middle Amherst Cove (Newfoundland)
Middle Arm, White Bay (Newfoundland)
Midland (Newfoundland)
Mill Cove (Newfoundland)
Miller's Passage (Newfoundland)
Millertown Junction (Newfoundland)
Millville (Newfoundland)
Milton (Newfoundland)
Mint Brook (Newfoundland)
Mobile (Newfoundland)
Molliers (Newfoundland)
Monkstown (Newfoundland)
Monroe (Newfoundland)
Moore's Cove (Newfoundland)
Moreton's Harbour (Newfoundland)
Morley's Siding (Newfoundland)
The Motion (Newfoundland)
Mud Lake (Labrador)
Muddy Bay (Labrador)
Muddy Brook (Newfoundland)
Muddy Hole (Newfoundland)
Mulligan (Labrador)
Murray's Harbour (Labrador)

N

Natuashish (Labrador)
The Neck (Newfoundland)
New Bonaventure (Newfoundland)
New Bridge (Newfoundland)
New Chelsea (Newfoundland)
New Ferolle (Newfoundland)
New Harbour (Newfoundland)
New Melbourne (Newfoundland)
New Perlican (Newfoundland)
Newman's Cove (Newfoundland)
Newport (Newfoundland)
Newtown (Newfoundland)
Newville (Newfoundland)
Noddy Bay (Newfoundland)
Noggin Cove (Newfoundland)
Norman's Bay (Labrador)
Norris Arm (Newfoundland)
 Norris Arm North (Newfoundland)
North Branch (Newfoundland)
North Harbour (Newfoundland)
North West Arm (Newfoundland)
North West Brook (Newfoundland)
Northern Bay (Newfoundland)
Noel's Pond (Newfoundland)

O

Ochre Pit Cove (Newfoundland)
Oderin Island (Newfoundland)
O'Donnells (Newfoundland)
Old Bonaventure (Newfoundland)
Old Shop (Newfoundland)
Open Hall (Newfoundland)
O'Regan's (Newfoundland)
Osmond (Newfoundland)
Otterbury (Newfoundland)

P

Parsons Harbour (Newfoundland)
Pass Island (Newfoundland)
Patrick's Cove (Newfoundland)
Perry's Cove (Newfoundland)
Petite Forte (Newfoundland)
Petites (Newfoundland)
Petley (Newfoundland)
Philips Head (Newfoundland)
Piccadilly (Newfoundland)
Piccaire (Newfoundland)
Pigeon Cove (Newfoundland)
Pikes Arm (Newfoundland)
Pinchard's Island (Newfoundland)
Pines Cove (Newfoundland)
Pinsent's Arm (Newfoundland)
Plate Cove East (Newfoundland)
Plate Cove West (Newfoundland)
Pleasantville (Newfoundland)
Plum Point (Newfoundland)
Point au Mal (Newfoundland)
Point Enragée (Newfoundland)
Point La Haye (Newfoundland)
Point Verde (Newfoundland)
Pollards Point (Newfoundland)
Pond Cove (Newfoundland)
Port Albert (Newfoundland)
Port Anne (Newfoundland)
Port au Bras (Newfoundland)
Port aux Basques, Channel-Port aux Basques (Newfoundland)
Port de Grave (Newfoundland)
Port Union, Trinity Bay North (Newfoundland)
Portland (Newfoundland)
Portland Creek (Newfoundland)
Portugal Cove South (Newfoundland)
Presque (Newfoundland)
Princeton (Newfoundland)
Pumbley Cove (Newfoundland)
Purbeck's Cove (Newfoundland)
Purcell's Harbour (Newfoundland)
Pynn's Brook (Newfoundland)

Q

Queen's Cove (Newfoundland)
Quidi Vidi, St. John's (Newfoundland)
Quirpon (Newfoundland)

R

Ragged Harbour (Newfoundland)
Ragged Islands (Labrador)
Ragged Islands (Newfoundland)
Random Island (Newfoundland)
Rantem (Newfoundland)
Rattling Brook (Newfoundland)
Red Brook (Newfoundland)
Red Cliff (Newfoundland)
Red Cove (Newfoundland)
Red Head Cove (Newfoundland)
Red Island (Newfoundland)
Red Island Placentia (Newfoundland)
Red Rocks (Newfoundland)
Redlands (Newfoundland)
Reef's Harbour (Newfoundland)
Renews, Renews-Cappahayden (Newfoundland)
Richard's Harbour (Newfoundland)
Rider's Harbour (Newfoundland)
Roaches Line (Newfoundland)
Robinsons (Newfoundland)
Robinsons Bight (Newfoundland)
Rock Harbour (Newfoundland)
Rodgers Cove (Newfoundland)
The Rooms (Newfoundland)
Round Harbour, Fogo Island (Newfoundland)
Round Harbour 2 (Newfoundland)
Round Harbour 3 (Newfoundland)
Round Harbour 4 (Newfoundland)
Round Harbour 5 (Newfoundland)
Roundabout (Newfoundland)
Russells Cove (Newfoundland)

S

Saddle Island (Newfoundland)
Safe Harbour (Newfoundland)
Sagona (Newfoundland)
Sailor's Island (Newfoundland)
St. Andrew's (Newfoundland)
St. Anne's (Newfoundland)
St. Anthony Bight (Newfoundland)
St. Barbe (Newfoundland)
St. Brides (Newfoundland)
St. Carol's (Newfoundland)
St. Catherine's (Newfoundland)
St. Chad's (Newfoundland)
St. David's (Newfoundland)
St. Fintan's (Newfoundland)
St. Jones Within (Newfoundland)
St. Jones Without (Newfoundland)
St. Joseph's Cove (Newfoundland)
St. Jude's (Newfoundland)
St. Kryan's (Newfoundland)
St. Leonard's (Newfoundland)
St. Michaels (Newfoundland)
St. Patrick's (Newfoundland)
St. Phillip's (Newfoundland)
St. Stephen's (Newfoundland)
St. Teresa (Newfoundland)
St. Thomas (Newfoundland)
St. Veronica's (Newfoundland)

Salmonier (Newfoundland)
 Samiajij Miawpukek (Newfoundland)
Samson Island (Newfoundland)
Sandy Point (Newfoundland)
Searston (Newfoundland)
Shearstown (Newfoundland)
Sheaves Cove (Newfoundland)
Sheppardville (Newfoundland)
Sheshatshiu (Labrador)
Ship Cove (Newfoundland)
Ship Harbour (Newfoundland)
Shoal Brook (Newfoundland)
Shoal Cove East (Newfoundland)
Shoal Cove West (Newfoundland)
Shoal Harbour (Newfoundland)
Shoe Cove (Newfoundland)
Sibley's Cove (Newfoundland)
Smith Sound
Smith's Harbour (Newfoundland)
Snook's Harbour (Newfoundland)
Sop's Arm (Newfoundland)
South Branch (Newfoundland)
South Dildo (Newfoundland)
Southeast Bight (Newfoundland)
Southern Arm (Newfoundland)
Southeast Placentia (Newfoundland)
Southern Bay (Newfoundland)
Southport (Newfoundland)
Southwest Arm (Newfoundland)
Spanish Room (Newfoundland)
Spencers Cove (Newfoundland)
Spillars Cove, Trinity Bay (Newfoundland)
Spillers Cove (Newfoundland)
Spread Eagle (Newfoundland)
Springfield (Newfoundland)
Stag Harbour (Newfoundland)
Stanhope (Newfoundland)
Stock Cove (Newfoundland)
Stoneville (Newfoundland)
Straitsview (Newfoundland)
Summerville (Newfoundland)
Swain's Island (Newfoundland)
Sweet Bay (Newfoundland)
Swift Current (Newfoundland)

T

Tack's Beach (Newfoundland)
Taylor's Bay (Newfoundland)
Tea Cove (Newfoundland)
Templeman (Newfoundland)

The Thicket (Newfoundland)
Thornlea (Newfoundland)
Thoroughfare (Newfoundland)
Three Arms (Newfoundland)
Three Mile Rock (Newfoundland)
Three Rock Cove (Newfoundland)
Tibbos Hill (Newfoundland)
Tickle Cove (Newfoundland)
Tickle Harbor (Bellevue) (Newfoundland)
Tickles (Newfoundland)
Tilt Cove, Twillingate (Newfoundland)
Tilton (Newfoundland)
Tizzard's Harbour (Newfoundland)
Tompkins (Newfoundland)
Toogood Arm (Newfoundland)
Topsail (Newfoundland)
Torbay (Newfoundland)
Tors Cove (Newfoundland)
Toslow (Newfoundland)
Triangle (Labrador)
Trinity East (Newfoundland)
Trouty (Newfoundland)
Turks Cove (Newfoundland)

U

Upper Amherst Cove (Newfoundland)
Upper Burgeo (Newfoundland)
Upper Ferry (Newfoundland)
Upper Gullies (Newfoundland)
Upper Island Cove (Newfoundland)
Upper Small Point (Newfoundland)
Upshall Station (Newfoundland)

V

Valleyfield, New-Wes-Valley (Newfoundland)
Vardyville (Newfoundland)
Venison Island (Labrador)
Vere Island (Newfoundland)
Victoria Cove (Newfoundland)
Villa Marie (Newfoundland)
Virgin Arm (Newfoundland)
Voy's Beach (Newfoundland)

W

West Bay (Newfoundland)
Woman Cove (Newfoundland)
Woodville (Newfoundland)
Woody Island (Newfoundland)

See also 

 List of cities in Canada
 List of designated places in Newfoundland and Labrador
 List of municipalities in Newfoundland and Labrador
 List of people from Newfoundland and Labrador
 List of population centres in Newfoundland and Labrador
 Newfoundland outport

References
Newfoundland's Namescape Unpublished manuscript, Floreen Carter, Phelps Publishing, London Ont. Original manuscript now located at Memorial University Archives 2008 and 2014.

External links 
Community Finder
Community Files in the Centre for Newfoundland Studies
Places in NL
Explore NL
NL Museum
NL Geography and Picture collection
Stats Canada
Government of Newfoundland and Labrador.
Newfoundland and Labrador Heritage
Newfoundland and Labrador Tourism
Newfoundland: The Most Irish Place Outside of Ireland
Religion, Society, and Culture in Newfoundland and Labrador

Communities